Katrancı may refer to:

 Katrancı, Biga
 Katrancı, Eskil, village in Aksaray Province, Turkey
 Katrancı, Haymana, village in Ankara Province, Turkey